2010 State Farm Pacific-10 Conference Women's Basketball Tournament was a post season tournament for the women's basketball teams in the Pacific-10 conference. The games were held on Thursday through Sunday, March 11–14, at the Galen Center (Los Angeles, California). Stanford was the tournament champion and became the NCAA tournament automatic qualifier, having beaten the Bruins of UCLA in the championship game.

Schedule

Rankings from AP Poll.

All-Tournament Team
Source:

Most Outstanding Player

This is the 5th time that the MOP of the Tournament was also the Pac-10’s Player of the Year.  Stanford’s Nicole Powell (2002, 2004) and Candice Wiggins (2005, 2008) were also MOP and POY in the same season.

Game notes

 Stanford has made the NCAA field for the 23rd consecutive season, 24 times in history.
 Stanford has a 25–2 tournament record.  UCLA has an 11–8 record.
 UCLA and Stanford have met 7 times in the tournament, a record, with Stanford winning 6 games.
 The 24-point margin of victory was the 2nd highest in the championship game. Last year's 25-point was the highest.
 Stanford's Jayne Appel and Kayla Pedersen started their third consecutive Tournament title game; Appel started her first game of the Tournament.

See also
 2010 NCAA Women's Division I Basketball Tournament

References

External links
 Tournament site

 Tournament
Basketball competitions in Los Angeles
Women's sports in California
2010 in sports in California
2010 in Los Angeles